Stanley Donen was an American film director and choreographer. He is known for his innovative musicals of the golden age of Hollywood which include Singin' in the Rain (1952), On the Town (1949), Funny Face (1957), It's Always Fair Weather (1955), as well as the romance films Charade (1963), Indiscreet (1958), and Two for the Road (1967).

Major associations

Academy Awards

Drama Desk Awards

Directors Guild Award

Film festivals

Cannes Film Festival

Berlin International Film Festival

Edinburgh International Festival

Palm Springs Film Festival

San Francisco Film Festival

San Sebastián Film Festival

Venice Film Festival

Critics awards

Los Angeles Film Critics Association

National Board of Review

Miscellaneous awards

References 

Lists of awards received by American actor